Rowena Othlie Jackson  (also known as Chatfield; born 24 March 1926) is a New Zealand former prima ballerina.

Early life
Jackson was born in Invercargill on 24 March 1926 to William Ernest Jackson and Lilian Jane, née Solomon. As a young child her ballet teachers were Stan Lawson and Rosetta Powell in Dunedin. She attended primary schools in Invercargill (Waihopai School), Dunedin (Musselburgh School) and Auckland (Maungawhau School), followed by Epsom Girls' Grammar School. In 1939 there was a benefit concert held at His Majesty's Theatre, Auckland to raise funds for Jackson to continue her study in Paris, however because of World War II Jackson and her mother went to Melbourne and Sydney instead. In 1941 Jackson won the first Royal Academy of Dance scholarship in New Zealand.

Career
In 1946, Jackson joined the Sadler's Wells Ballet in London. She was notable for her role as Swanhilda in the ballet Coppélia, and danced with Robert Helpmann and her husband Philip Chatfield.

By February 1954, she had been promoted to prima ballerina at Sadler's Wells Ballet.

She was renowned for her special gift for fast and brilliant turns. In 1940, before she left New Zealand, she set a world record when she performed 121 fouettés sur place.

Jackson and Chatfield danced together in the Royal Ballet's production of Giselle shortly after they married. The couple retired from the Royal Ballet in 1959 and moved to New Zealand, where she became artistic director of the Royal New Zealand Ballet company. Each of them served as director of the New Zealand Ballet School.

Although Jackson cites the dancing of Fred Astaire and Eleanor Powell as being influences on her, it was a visit from the Russian ballerina Irina Baronova who inspired her to make ballet her 'life's ambition'.

Personal life
On 4 February 1958, Jackson married the British dancer Philip Chatfield. They had a son Paul (born 1960), and a daughter Rosetta (born 1961). In 1991, they were living in Te Atatū. On retirement they moved the Gold Coast in Queensland in 1993. Chatfield died in Brisbane in July 2021.

Honours and awards
In the 1961 New Year Honours, Jackson was appointed a Member of the Order of the British Empire, for services to ballet. She was the first dancer to receive this honour.

References

External links
The Ballerina Gallery – Rowena Jackson (archived copy in Internet Archive)
Our Stars of Ballet (1960) - short film on Rowena Jackson and Alexander Grant, NZ On Screen

1926 births
Living people
New Zealand ballerinas
People from Invercargill
Prima ballerinas
Dancers of The Royal Ballet
New Zealand Members of the Order of the British Empire
People educated at Epsom Girls' Grammar School
20th-century New Zealand dancers
20th-century ballet dancers